Maša Zec Peškirič (born 21 January 1987) is a Slovenian former tennis player.

In her career, she won 14 singles titles and ten doubles titles on the ITF Women's Circuit. On 15 June 2009, she reached her best singles ranking of world No. 93. On 19 October 2009, she peaked at No. 130 in the doubles rankings.

Zec Peškirič made her debut for the Slovenia Fed Cup team in April 2006. She has a win–loss record of 8–22 in the competition.

ITF Circuit finals

Singles: 23 (14 titles, 9 runner-ups)

Doubles: 25 (10–15)

External links
 
 
 
 

1987 births
Living people
Sportspeople from Jesenice, Jesenice
Slovenian female tennis players